The Shanxi Hangtian Victory is a five-door Microvan made by Guizhou Hangtian Chenggong Automobile, a subsidiary of Shanxi Victory.

Overview

The Shanxi Hangtian Victory is powered by a 1.2 liter ‘HH465QE6’ inline-four engine producing 60 hp based on an engine design from Suzuki. Both engine options are mated to a 5-speed manual gearbox. Price of the Shanxi Hangtian Victory at the dealers starts from 43,000 yuan (US$6,700).

The Shanxi Hangtian Victory is equipped with front independent MacPherson struts and rear non-independent leaf springs. The powertrain is middle engined and rear-wheel drive.

The manufacturer of the Shanxi Hangtian Victory, the Guizhou Hangtian Chenggong Automobile, is based in Zunyi city in Guizhou Province. It became a subsidiary of Shanxi Victory in 2006. The name translates to ‘Guizhou Aerospace Automotive Manufacturing Corporation.

Design controversies
Just like a few other vehicles produced by Guizhou Hangtian Chenggong Automobile, the front fascia design of the Shanxi Hangtian Victory is controversial as it heavily resembles the front end of the third generation Cadillac Escalade.

References

External links
[www.htauto.cn official site]

Microvans
Minivans
2010s cars
Cars of China